Song Hyun-wook is a South Korean Television director. His debut TV drama was The Splendor of Youth in 2008. Presently he is attached with Studio&NEW since 2017. He is known for his direction in TV series: Another Miss Oh (2016), Revolutionary Love (2017), The Beauty Inside (2018) and The King's Affection (2021) among others. In 2022, he is directing MBC TV series Golden Spoon.

Filmography

References

External links 
 
 
 Song Hyun-wook at Daum (Korean)

Living people
South Korean film directors
South Korean television directors
Year of birth missing (living people)
Place of birth missing (living people)